The Dragoon is a breed of fancy pigeon developed over many years of selective breeding. Dragoons, along with other varieties of domesticated pigeons, are all descendants of the wild rock dove (Columba livia). The Dragoon was one of the breeds used in the development of the Racing Homer.
A very old breed of British origin, referred to by Moore (1735).

A similar looking pigeon is the Indian Gola, but the Gola has more mottled wings.

See also 

List of pigeon breeds

References

Pigeon breeds
Pigeon breeds originating in the United Kingdom